Maura Dooley (born 18 May 1957)  is a British poet and writer. She has published five collections of poetry and edited several anthologies. She is the winner of the Eric Gregory Award in 1987 and the Cholmondeley Award in 2016, and was shortlisted for the Forward Poetry Prize (single poem) in 1997 and again in 2015. Her poetry collections Life Under Water (2008) and Kissing A Bone (1996) were shortlisted for the T. S. Eliot Prize.

Biography
Maura Dooley was born on 18 May 1957 in Truro to Irish parents and grew up in Bristol. She obtained a BA (Hons) from the University of York in 1978 and attended the University of Bristol from 1980 to 1981.

She was the director of the writing centre at the Arvon Foundation in Yorkshire from 1982 to 1987. From 1987 to 1993, Dooley served as programme director of literature for the South Bank Centre in London. In the 1990s she helped develop family films for Jim Henson Productions and developed a theatre workshop for Performing Arts Labs. Dooley is currently Professor of Creative Writing  at Goldsmiths, University of London.

Dooley has been a judge for the T.S. Eliot Prize, the National Poetry Competition, the Forward Prize and the London Arts New London Writers Awards.

Poetry collections

The Silvering (2016)
Life under Water (2008)
Sound Barrier  (2002)
Kissing a Bone (1996)
Explaining Magnetism (1991)

Other publications

Ghahreman, Azita. (2018) Negative of a Group Photograph (Dooley, Maura; Shakerifar, Elhum, trans.) The Poetry Translation Centre / Bloodaxe Books.

Awards

 1987 Eric Gregory Award
 2016 Cholmondeley Award

References

External links
 Maura Dooley on the British Council's website.
 Maura Dooley on Poetry International Web.
 Poem of the Week: In a dream she meets him again by Maura Dooley. Article in The Guardian. Published 5 September 2016.

1957 births
Living people
21st-century British poets
21st-century Irish poets
21st-century British women writers
Alumni of the University of York
Alumni of the University of Bristol
Irish women poets
People from Truro